Nasir Ahmed (born 18 December 1989) is a Pakistani first-class cricketer who plays for Peshawar cricket team.

References

External links
 

1989 births
Living people
Pakistani cricketers
Peshawar cricketers
Cricketers from Peshawar